List of World War II monuments and memorials in the Montenegro represent Yugoslav monuments and memorials built on the territory of the present day Montenegro.

See also

People's Heroes of Yugoslavia monuments
List of Yugoslav World War II monuments and memorials
List of World War II monuments and memorials in Bosnia and Herzegovina
List of World War II monuments and memorials in Croatia
List of World War II monuments and memorials in North Macedonia
List of World War II monuments and memorials in Serbia
List of World War II monuments and memorials in Slovenia

World War II memorials
Montenegro
Montenegro in World War II